Ghwarband is a valley in the Shangla District of the Khyber Pakhtunkhwa province, Pakistan.

The Khans of Ghwarband valley belong to the Yousufzai and Muhammadzai (Hashtnagar) tribe. The local population are Gujjars.

One sub-division of the Muhammadzai tribe is settled in Ghwarband valley.

Hafiz Alpuri was born in the valley of Ghwarband. He belonged to the Mandan Yousafzai tribe. Muhammad Anwar baba, a famous Pushtun Khan, belonged to the Muhammadzai tribe of Pushtuns was also born in Ghwarband.

References 

Shangla District